North Macedonia participated in the Junior Eurovision Song Contest 2019 which took place on 24 November 2019 in Gliwice, Poland. The national broadcaster MRT was responsible for organising North Macedonia's entry for the contest. On 9 July 2019, Mila Moskov was internally selected as the Macedonian representative.

Background

In the 2018 contest, Marija Spasovska represented her country in Minsk, Belarus with the song "Doma". The song ended 12th out of 20 entries with 99 points.

Before Junior Eurovision
On 9 July 2019, the national broadcaster revealed that they had chosen Mila Moskov internally to represent North Macedonia in the Junior Eurovision Song Contest 2019. Her song for the contest, "Fire", written by Lazar Cvetkoski and Magdalena Cvetkoska, was revealed on 15 October 2019.

Artist and song information

Mila Moskov
Mila Moskov (born 8 March 2005) is a Macedonian singer. She represented North Macedonia at the Junior Eurovision Song Contest 2019 with the song "Fire". She started her music career when she was six years old. Her singing career began at her local music school where she learned to sing and play the piano.

Fire
"Fire" is a song by Macedonian child singer Mila Moskov. It represented North Macedonia at the Junior Eurovision Song Contest 2019.

At Junior Eurovision
During the opening ceremony and the running order draw which both took place on 18 November 2019, North Macedonia was drawn to perform fourth on 24 November 2019, following Russia and preceding Spain.

Voting

Detailed voting results

References

North Macedonia
Junior Eurovision Song Contest
2019